Margaritidae is a family of small sea snails, marine gastropod mollusks in the superfamily Trochoidea (according to the taxonomy of the Gastropoda by Bouchet & Rocroi, 2005).

Margaritinae Thiele, 1924, originally a subfamily in  Trochidae was moved to Turbinidae following Williams et al. 2007. It has been elevated to the rank of family Margaritidae. This family has no subfamilies.

Genera 
Genera within the family Margaritidae include:
 Anomphalogaza Hickman, 2012
 Antimargarita Powell, 1951
 Callogaza Dall, 1881
 Gaza Watson, 1879
 Margarites Gray, 1847
Genera brought into synonymy
 Eumargarita P. Fischer, 1885: synonym of Margarites Gray, 1847
 Margarita Leach, 1819: synonym of Margarites Gray, 1847
 Valvatella Gray, 1857: synonym of Margarites Gray, 1847

References 
 Bouchet P. & Rocroi J.-P. (2005) Classification and nomenclator of gastropod families. Malacologia 47(1-2): 1-397
 Hickman C.S. (2012) A new genus and two new species of deep-sea gastropods (Gastropoda: Vetigastropoda: Gazidae). The Nautilus 126(2): 57–67
 Williams S.T. (2012) Advances in molecular systematics of the vetigastropod superfamily Trochoidea. Zoologica Scripta 41(6): 571-595.